Into the Unknown with Josh Bernstein is a 2008 documentary television series hosted by American explorer Josh Bernstein and written by Bernadette McDaid. The series was created for Discovery Channel. The series premiered on 18 August 2008 in the United States.

Episodes 
Episode 1 – The Secret Life of Gladiators
Episode 2 – Search for Noah's Ark
Episode 3 – The Cloud Warriors
Episode 4 – Living with Mummies
Episode 5 – Egypt's Lost King
Episode 6 – Lost Gold of Timbuktu
Episode 7 – Why Elephants Attack
Episode 8 – The Search for Life

External links
 
 

2008 American television series debuts
Discovery Channel original programming
English-language television shows
2008 American television series endings
2000s American documentary television series